Sarah Egerton may refer to:

Sarah Fyge Egerton (1668–1723), English poet
Sarah Egerton (actress) (1782–1847), English actress